Verkhniye Bishindy (Ürge Bişende) is a rural locality (a selo) and the administrative centre of Verkhnebishindinsky Selsoviet, Tuymazinsky District, Bashkortostan, Russia. The population was 725 as of 2010. There are 5 streets.

Geography 
Verkhniye Bishindy is located 15 km south of Tuymazy (the district's administrative centre) by road. Novye Bishindy is the nearest rural locality.

References 

Rural localities in Tuymazinsky District